Etiënne Reijnen (born 5 April 1987) is a retired Dutch footballer. He played as a centre back.

Career

Born in Zwolle, he played for amateur clubs Rohda Raalte, WVF and Vitesse Arnhem as a youth. In 2005, he joined PEC Zwolle in the Eerste divisie. In May 2010, Scottish club Falkirk were linked with a move for him, but he joined AZ in the Eredivisie in 2011, for a fee of around €100,000.

Career statistics

Club

Honours

Club
AZ
KNVB Cup (1): 2012–13

References

External links
 

1987 births
Living people
Dutch footballers
Eredivisie players
Eerste Divisie players
PEC Zwolle players
AZ Alkmaar players
SC Cambuur players
FC Groningen players
Sportspeople from Zwolle
Maccabi Haifa F.C. players
Dutch expatriate footballers
Dutch expatriate sportspeople in Israel
Association football defenders
Footballers from Overijssel
Rohda Raalte players
Expatriate footballers in Israel